is a 1994 fighting video game developed by Arc System Works and published by Angel for the Super Famicom. It is based upon Naoko Takeuchi's Sailor Moon manga and anime series and stars heroic teenage girls who represent the major celestial bodies of the solar system. The player takes control of one of the girls who have decided to stage a fighting tournament to determine who should lead the group.

Sailor Moon S: Jōgai Rantō!? Shuyaku Sōdatsusen served as both the first full-fledge fighting game in the Sailor Moon franchise and the first fighting project created by Arc System Works. In 1996, an updated version titled  was published by Angel for the Super Famicom and featured several additions not found in the original release. The game garnered mixed reception from critics upon its initial launch, though retrospective reviews have been more positive. It has been featured at the Evolution Championship Series tournament, among other fighting game events.

Gameplay 

Bishōjo Senshi Sailor Moon S: Jōgai Rantō!? Shuyaku Sōdatsusen is a fighting game similar to Street Fighter II and Mortal Kombat set in Naoko Takeuchi's Sailor Moon shōjo manga and anime series, taking place during the third season of the anime series after Sailor Moon R. In the game, players control either one of the eight high school girls who represent the celestial bodies of the solar system who are led by the titular Sailor Moon. One day, the girls become frustrated with Sailor Moon's leadership and they stage a fighting tournament to determine who is the best and should be the leader of the group. Players determine who is the best in a staged tournament by fighting against other characters in 1-on-1 matches and the fighter who manages to deplete the health bar of the opponent wins the first bout and the first to win two bouts becomes the winner of the match. 

The game features five modes of play and nine playable characters. Playable characters in the game are Sailor Moon, Sailor Mars, Sailor Venus, Sailor Mercury, Sailor Jupiter, Sailor Neptune, Sailor Uranus, Sailor Pluto and Chibimoon, Sailor Moon's daughter from the future. Sailor Moon S: Jōgai Rantō!? Shuyaku Sōdatsusen uses a customizable four-button control scheme, with throws being present and are similar to Super Street Fighter II Turbo. Some throws can also be teched by rapidly hitting buttons twice while being thrown. Special moves are present in conventional format, with most commands consisting of standard "quarter-circle" movements. Desperation moves are available at low health or with 9 seconds or less left on the clock and they become available once again until the next round and are considered a strong comeback mechanic.

Jōgai Rantō!? Shuyaku Sōdatsusen also differs from other fighting games of the era in various ways, featuring one of the earliest instances of dashes in the genre, with each character being capable of back-dashing while certain characters can also perform a forward dash. Players are able to cancel block stun into special moves, forward or back dashes, and desperation moves. Players can also customize characters prior to a match in the options menu screen.

Development and release 

Bishōjo Senshi Sailor Moon S: Jōgai Rantō!? Shuyaku Sōdatsusen was developed during the boom of fighting games after Street Fighter IIs launch. The game was both the first full-fledged fighting game in the Sailor Moon franchise and the first fighting title developed by Arc System Works, who had previously ported arcade games such as Double Dragon and Vigilante for the Sega Master System as well as Bishōjo Senshi Sailor Moon for the Sega Mega Drive. BlazBlue producer Kazuto Sekine briefly recounted the project's development process from first-hand accounts of both Arc System Works CEO Minoru Kidooka and Guilty Gear creator Daisuke Ishiwatari in a panel at Evo 2018, stating that grappling characters were becoming popular at the time and one of the programmers insisted on writing an algorithm system to make AI-controlled opponents feel "human-like" while Ishiwatari worked on the game as part-timer, testing characters using the newly-developed algorithm. Arc System Works would later go on to develop fighting games such as the Guilty Gear and BlazBlue franchises, as well as Dragon Ball FighterZ.

Bishōjo Senshi Sailor Moon S: Jōgai Rantō!? Shuyaku Sōdatsusen was first released in Japan by Angel for the Super Famicom on 16 December 1994, two months before Sailor Moon S finished airing in the region. The Sailor Moon franchise has a much larger audience in Japan than in America, which is the likely reason why the game was not released outside of Japan. On 29 March 1996, an updated version co-developed by Make Software and Monolith Corp. based on Sailor Moon SuperS titled Bishōjo Senshi Sailor Moon SuperS: Zenin Sanka!! Shuyaku Sōdatsusen was published by Angel, featuring the addition of Sailor Saturn as a playable character. Prior to launch, Sailor Moon SuperS was showcased to attendees of Shoshinkai 1995 and was initially slated for a February 1996 release date.

Reception and legacy 

Bishōjo Senshi Sailor Moon S: Jōgai Rantō!? Shuyaku Sōdatsusen and Sailor Moon SuperS: Zenin Sanka!! Shuyaku Sōdatsusen received mixed reviews upon release. Multiple reviewers remarked that the game was fairly difficult to complete in single player mode, with one reviewer noting that they had to set the difficulty to lowest to beat the game. Famitsu reported that the title sold over 37,095 copies in its first week on the market. The game sold approximately 59,918 copies during its lifetime in Japan.

However, retrospective reviews for Sailor Moon S: Jōgai Rantō!? Shuyaku Sōdatsusen were more positive. The 2016 mook Perfect Guide of Nostalgic Super Famicom listed it as the ninth best fighting game for the Super Famicom. In 2020, long time Sailor Moon fan Mina Ogawa reviewed the game for Japanese website Inside Games. Though admitting that she isn't very good at fighting games, Ogawa questioned the premise of the girls fighting each other as well as attacking the much younger Chibi. Despite this, she praised the title as being a competent fighting game.

Competitive play 
Jōgai Rantō!? Shuyaku Sōdatsusen has maintained a small cult following within the fighting game community since launch due to its unbalanced mechanics. It has been featured at fighting game tournaments such as AnimEVO, Evo 2018, Evo 2019 and Evo Japan 2020. Other notable tournaments have hosted the title as a major or a side event such as Yabai Invasion, Canada Cup, Combo Breaker, Frosty Faustings and CEOtaku.

Notes

References

External links 

 Bishōjo Senshi Sailor Moon S: Jōgai Rantō!? Shuyaku Sōdatsusen at GameFAQs
 Bishōjo Senshi Sailor Moon SuperS: Zenin Sanka!! Shuyaku Sōdatsusen at GameFAQs
 Bishōjo Senshi Sailor Moon S: Jōgai Rantō!? Shuyaku Sōdatsusen at Giant Bomb
 Bishōjo Senshi Sailor Moon SuperS: Zenin Sanka!! Shuyaku Sōdatsusen at Giant Bomb
 Bishōjo Senshi Sailor Moon S: Jōgai Rantō!? Shuyaku Sōdatsusen at MobyGames
 Bishōjo Senshi Sailor Moon SuperS: Zenin Sanka!! Shuyaku Sōdatsusen at MobyGames

1994 video games
Arc System Works games
Fighting games
Japan-exclusive video games
Multiplayer and single-player video games
Jōgai Rantō!? Shuyaku Sōdatsusen
Super Nintendo Entertainment System games
Super Nintendo Entertainment System-only games